Auplopus mellipes is a species of spider wasp in the family Pompilidae.

Subspecies
 Auplopus mellipes mellipes
 Auplopus mellipes variitarsus

References

Further reading

External links

 NCBI Taxonomy Browser, Auplopus mellipes

Pepsinae
Insects described in 1836